Bano is a village in the Bano CD block in the Simdega subdivision of the Simdega district in the Indian state of Jharkhand.

Geography

Location                                                                      
Bano is located at

Area overview 
In the area presented in the map alongside, “the landscape is formed of hills and undulating plateau” in the south-western part of the Chota Nagpur Plateau. About 32% of the district is covered with forests (mark the shaded portions in the map.) It is an overwhelmingly rural area with 92.83% of the population living in the rural areas.  A major portion of the rural population depends on rain-fed agriculture (average annual rainfall: 1,100-1,200 mm) for a living.

Note: The map alongside presents some of the notable locations in the district. All places marked in the map are linked in the larger full screen map.

Civic administration 
There is a police station at Bano. 
 
The headquarters of Bano CD block are located at Bano village.

Demographics 
According to the 2011 Census of India, Bano had a total population of 5,072, of which 2,493 (49%) were males and 2,579 (51%) were females. Population in the age range 0–6 years was 738. The total number of literate persons in Bano was 3,321 (76.63% of the population over 6 years.

(*For language details see Bano block#Language and religion)

Transport 
Bano railway station is on the Hatia-Rourkela line.

Education 
S.S. High School Bano is a Hindi-medium coeducational institution established in 1949. It has facilities for teaching in class VI to class XII. The school has a playground and a library with 309 books.

Kasturba Gandhi Balika Vidyalaya is a Hindi-medium girls only institution established in 2007. It has facilities for teaching in class VI to class XII. The school has a playground and a library with 405 books and has 6 computers for teaching and learning purposes.

Project Girls High School Bano is a Hindi-medium girls only institution established in 1984. It has facilities for teaching in class VI to class X. The school has a playground and a library with 1,353 books.

Healthcare   
There is a Community Health Centre (hospital) at Bano.

References 

Villages in Simdega district